Wensley railway station is a disused railway station on the Wensleydale Railway, in North Yorkshire, England.

It was opened by the North Eastern Railway on 1 February 1877, and served the village of Wensley.

The station was host to camping coach from 1936 to 1939 and may have had a coach visiting in 1934 and 1935.

The station closed on 26 April 1954. The station buildings and platforms survive as a private residence. The railway through the station was reopened as the Wensleydale Railway.

References

External links

 Wensley station on navigable 1947 O. S. map
 Video footage of Wensley Railway Station

Disused railway stations in North Yorkshire
Railway stations in Great Britain opened in 1877
Railway stations in Great Britain closed in 1954
Former North Eastern Railway (UK) stations
Wensleydale